Judeo-Berber or Judeo-Amazigh ( tamazight n wudayen,  berberit yehudit) is any of several hybrid Berber varieties traditionally spoken as a second language in Berber Jewish communities of central and southern Morocco, and perhaps earlier in Algeria. Judeo-Berber is (or was) a contact language; the first language of speakers was Judeo-Arabic. (There were also Jews who spoke Berber as their first language, but not a distinct Jewish variety.) Speakers immigrated to Israel in the 1950s and 1960s. While mutually comprehensible with the Tamazight spoken by most inhabitants of the area (Galand-Pernet et al. 1970:14), these varieties are distinguished by the use of Hebrew loanwords and the pronunciation of š as s (as in many Jewish Moroccan Arabic dialects).

Speaker population 
According to a 1936 survey, approximately 145,700 of Morocco's 161,000 Jews spoke a variety of Berber, 25,000 of whom were reportedly monolingual in the language.

Geographic distribution
Communities in Morocco where Jews spoke Judeo-Berber included: Tinghir, Ouijjane, Asaka, Imini, Draa valley, Demnate and Ait Bou Oulli in the Tamazight-speaking Middle Atlas and High Atlas and Oufrane, Tiznit and Illigh in the Tashelhiyt-speaking Souss valley (Galand-Pernet et al. 1970:2). Jews were living among tribal Berbers, often in the same villages and practiced old tribal Berber protection relationships.

Almost all speakers of Judeo-Berber left Morocco in the years following its independence, and their children have mainly grown up speaking other languages. In 1992, about 2,000 speakers remained, mainly in Israel; all are at least bilingual in Judeo-Arabic.

Phonology

Judeo-Berber is characterized by the following phonetic phenomena:

 Centralized pronunciation of /i u/ as [ɨ ʉ]
 Neutralization of the distinction between /s ʃ/, especially among monolingual speakers
 Delabialization of labialized velars (/kʷ gʷ xʷ ɣʷ/), e.g. nəkkʷni/nukkni > nəkkni 'us, we'
 Insertion of epenthetic [ə] to break up consonant clusters
 Frequent diphthong insertion, as in Judeo-Arabic
 Some varieties have q > kʲ and dˤ > tˤ, as in the local Arabic dialects
 In the eastern Sous Valley region, /l/ > [n] in both Judeo-Berber and Arabic

Usage
Apart from its daily use, Judeo-Berber was used for orally explaining religious texts, and only occasionally written, using Hebrew characters; a manuscript Pesah Haggadah written in Judeo-Berber has been reprinted (Galand-Pernet et al. 1970.) A few prayers, like the Benedictions over the Torah, were recited in Berber.

Example
Taken from Galand-Pernet et al. 1970:121 (itself from a manuscript from Tinghir):

See also
Judeo-Arabic languages
Judeo-Moroccan
Berber Jews

References

Bibliography
 P. Galand-Pernet & Haim Zafrani. Une version berbère de la Haggadah de Pesaḥ: Texte de Tinrhir du Todrha (Maroc).  Compress rendus du G.L.E.C.S. Supplement I. 1970. 
 Joseph Chetrit.  "Jewish Berber," Handbook of Jewish Languages, ed. Lily Kahn & Aaron D. Rubin.  Leiden: Brill.  2016.  Pages 118–129.

External links
Judeo-Berber, by Haim Zafrani 
Except from Haggadah

Berber Jews
Berber languages
Berbers in Morocco
Jews and Judaism in Morocco
Jews and Judaism in the Maghreb
Languages of Morocco
Maghrebi Jews
Sephardi Jewish culture in North Africa
Language contact